Gułów may refer to the following places in Poland:
Gułów, Lower Silesian Voivodeship (south-west Poland)
Gułów, Lublin Voivodeship (east Poland)